Nonprofit and Voluntary Sector Quarterly is a peer-reviewed academic journal that covers research on the nonprofit and voluntary sector. The journal's editors are Joanne Carman (University of North Carolina at Charlotte) and Jaclyn Piatak (University of North Carolina at Charlotte). It was established in 1972 and is currently published by SAGE Publications on behalf of the Association for Research on Nonprofit Organizations and Voluntary Action
.

Abstracting and indexing 
Nonprofit and Voluntary Sector Quarterly is abstracted and indexed in Scopus and the Social Sciences Citation Index. According to the Journal Citation Reports, its 2021 impact factor is 3.348.

References

External links 
 
 Association for Research on Nonprofit Organizations and Voluntary Action

SAGE Publishing academic journals
English-language journals
Sociology journals
Bimonthly journals
Publications established in 1972